The 2022–2023 mpox outbreak in Italy is part of the larger outbreak of human mpox caused by the West African clade of the monkeypox virus. Italy was the sixth country, outside of the African countries with endemic mpox, to experience an outbreak in 2022. The first case was documented in Rome, Italy, on May 19, 2022. As of August 5th, Italy has 505 cases.

Background 

An ongoing outbreak of mpox was confirmed on May 6, 2022, beginning with a British resident who, after travelling to Nigeria (where the disease is endemic), presented symptoms consistent with mpox on April 29, 2022. The resident returned to the United Kingdom on May 4, creating the country's index case of the outbreak. The origin of several of the cases of mpox in the United Kingdom is unknown. Some monitors saw community transmission taking place in the London area as of mid-May, but it has been suggested that cases were already spreading in Europe in the previous months.

Transmission 

A large portion of those infected were believed to have not recently traveled to areas of Africa where mpox is normally found, such as Nigeria, the Democratic Republic of the Congo as well as central and western Africa. It is believed to be transmitted by close contact with sick people, with extra caution for those individuals with lesions on their skin or genitals, along with their bedding and clothing. The CDC has also stated that individuals should avoid contact and consumption of dead animals such as rats, squirrels, monkeys and apes along with wild game or lotions derived from animals in Africa.

In addition to more common symptoms, such as fever, headache, swollen lymph nodes, and rashes or lesions, some patients have also experienced proctitis, an inflammation of the rectum lining. CDC has also warned clinicians to not rule out mpox in patients with sexually transmitted infections since there have been reports of co-infections with syphilis, gonorrhea, chlamydia, and herpes.

History

The first case in Italy was reported in 19 May 2022 at the Spallanzani hospital in Rome the person who got mpox was kept in isolation.

See also
 2022–2023 mpox outbreak
 2022–2023 mpox outbreak in Canada
 2022–2023 mpox outbreak in France
 2022–2023 mpox outbreak in Germany
 2022–2023 mpox outbreak in the United Kingdom
 2022–2023 mpox outbreak in the United States
 2003 Midwest monkeypox outbreak
 2022–2023 mpox outbreak in New York (state)
 Monkeypox virus
 Timeline of the 2022–2023 mpox outbreak
 Smallpox vaccine

Notes

References

Italy
Mpox